Dresden is a 2006 German television film directed by Roland Suso Richter. It is set during the bombing of Dresden in World War II.

This romance movie takes place during the historical Anglo-American bombing of the city of Dresden in February 1945. It was produced by the ZDF, a German Public Television Programme, and was originally split in two parts of 90 minutes each. A cinema version was then released in 2010.

The film was inspired by Jörg Friedrich's book "The Fire". The €10 million production was shot on original locations in Dresden and Chemnitz.

Plot
Anna (Felicitas Woll), daughter of a wealthy hospital director, works as a nurse along with her father and her future husband, Doctor Alexander (Benjamin Sadler). Whilst behind enemy lines, British pilot Robert Newman (John Light) is severely wounded and hides in the hospital's cellar. Anna finds him and cures his wounds, slowly falling in love with him.

The story takes place during the bombing of Dresden (14 to 15 February 1945) and it follows the characters through 3 days in the city.

Cast

References

External links
 

2006 films
2006 television films
German television films
2000s German-language films
German-language television shows
ZDF original programming
German World War II films
German aviation films
Films about shot-down aviators
Films scored by Harald Kloser
Films set in 1945
Films set in Dresden
2000s German films